Thomas Findlay (born 2 January 1881) was a Scottish footballer who played mainly as an inside left for clubs including Kilmarnock, Motherwell and Port Glasgow Athletic – at all three, his elder brother Robert was among his teammates. With Port Glasgow, he was a Renfrewshire Cup winner in 1909. He also featured for Hibernian (scoring the winner for the club in the 1906 Rosebery Charity Cup final), Morton (two Scottish Cup appearances only), Albion Rovers and Nithsdale Wanderers.

References

1881 births
Year of death missing
Scottish footballers
Association football inside forwards
Scottish Football League players
Scottish Junior Football Association players
Kilmarnock F.C. players
Hibernian F.C. players
Motherwell F.C. players
Albion Rovers F.C. players
Nithsdale Wanderers F.C. players
Greenock Morton F.C. players
Port Glasgow Athletic F.C. players
Footballers from Kilmarnock